The Dungeness crab (Metacarcinus magister)  is a species of crab inhabiting eelgrass beds and water bottoms along the west coast of North America. Its common name comes from Dungeness Spit, United States, which shelters a shallow bay inhabited by the crabs.

Description

The carapace widths of mature Dungeness crabs may reach 10 inches, or 25.4 centimeters, but are typically 6-7 inches, or approximately 15-18 centimeters. They are a popular delicacy, and are the most commercially important crab in the Pacific Northwest, as well as the western states generally. The annual Dungeness Crab and Seafood Festival is held in Port Angeles, Washington each October.

Dungeness crabs have a wide, long, hard shell, which they must periodically moult to grow; this process is called ecdysis. They have five pairs of legs, which are similarly armoured, the foremost pair of which ends in claws the crab uses both as defense and to tear apart large food items. The crab uses its smaller appendages to pass the food particles into its mouth. Once inside the crab's stomach, food is further digested by the "gastric mill", a collection of tooth-like structures. M. magister prefers to eat clams, other crustaceans and small fish, but is also an effective scavenger. Dungeness crabs can bury themselves completely in the sand if threatened.

Life cycle and ecology
Mature female crabs generally molt between May and August, and mating occurs immediately after the female has molted and before the new exoskeleton hardens. Males are attracted to potential mates by pheromones present in the urine of females. Upon locating an available female, the male initiates a protective premating embrace that lasts for several days. In this embrace, the female is tucked underneath the male, oriented such that their abdomens touch and their heads face each other. Mating occurs only after the female has molted, and the female signals her readiness to molt by urinating on or near the antennae of the male. The female extrudes the eggs from her body several months later; however, they remain attached under her abdomen for three to five months until they hatch. Young crabs are free-swimming after hatching, and go through five larval stages before reaching maturity after about 10 molts or two years.

Juvenile crabs develop in eelgrass beds and estuaries where salinity levels tend to be low. The hyposaline conditions of the estuaries are lethal to some of the crab's symbionts, such as Carcinonemertes errans which consumes a brooding female's live eggs. Dungeness crabs surveyed in Coos Bay were less likely to be infected by C. errans and have fewer worms present on their carapace when inhabiting less saline waters farther inland.

Distribution
Its typical range extends from Alaska's Aleutian Islands to Point Conception, near Santa Barbara, California, while it is occasionally found as far south as Magdalena Bay, Baja California Sur, Mexico.

A genetic analysis of adult Dungeness crabs indicated that there is one population across the California Current System, but it is likely that interannual variation in physical oceanographic conditions (such as ocean circulation patterns) influence larval recruitment among regions, causing genetic diversity to change through time.

Culinary use

The Dungeness crab is considered a delicacy in the United States and Canada.  Long before the area was settled by Europeans, Indigenous peoples throughout the crustacean's range had the crab as a traditional part of their diet and harvested them every year at low tide. The flesh has what is considered to be a delicate flavour and slightly sweet taste. Today they are an integral part of the cuisines of California, British Columbia, and the Pacific Northwest and traditionally feature in dishes like Crab Louie  or Cioppino.

About one-quarter of the crab's weight is meat. Dungeness crabs can typically be purchased either live or cooked. Many cook live crabs by simply dropping them into boiling salt water, waiting for a boil to return, and then allowing it to continue for 15 minutes, after which time the crabs are removed and placed into cold water to cool, and then cleaned. Another method of preparing crab is called half backing. Half backing is done by flipping the crab upside down and chopping it in half (from head to "tail"), after which the guts and gills can be scooped or hosed out. Many consider half backing to be superior to cooking the entire crab, because the meat is not contaminated by the flavor or toxins of the guts. Furthermore, half backed crabs boil faster or can be quickly steamed instead of boiled. Two common tools for removing crab meat from the shell are a crab cracker and a shrimp fork. Sometimes, a cleaver, mallet, or small hammer is used for cracking Dungeness crab, but the use of these devices is not recommended, as the integrity of the meat may be compromised by the impact.

Sustainability
Seafood Watch has given the Dungeness crab a sustainable seafood rating of "Good Alternative" to overfished species or fish that is farmed in ways that harm other marine life or the environment. In 2014, 53 million pounds worth $170 million was harvested.

A 2020 study funded by NOAA showed that larval crabs are being affected by ocean acidification caused by lowered pH levels resulting in a higher concentration of hydrogen ions.

"State crustacean" designation in Oregon
In 2009, after lobbying from schoolchildren at Sunset Primary School in West Linn, Oregon, and citing its importance to the Oregon economy, the Oregon Legislative Assembly designated the Dungeness crab as the state crustacean of Oregon.

References
Notes

Further reading

dungeness crab
Edible crustaceans
Commercial crustaceans
Crustaceans of the eastern Pacific Ocean
Fauna of Alaska
Fauna of Western Canada
Fauna of the Western United States
Symbols of Oregon
Fauna of the San Francisco Bay Area
Crustaceans described in 1852
Taxa named by James Dwight Dana